Donald "Don" Ringe is an American linguist and Indo-Europeanist.

Ringe graduated from University of Kentucky and then received a Master of Philosophy in Linguistics as a Marshall Scholar from the University of Oxford. He received Ph.D in linguistics at Yale University in 1984, under the supervision of the late Warren Cowgill. He taught Classics at Bard College from 1983 to 1985. Since 1985, he has been on the Faculty in Linguistics at the University of Pennsylvania, where he has been a full professor since 1996.

He is the author of numerous articles and books, chiefly on historical Indo-European linguistics, especially Ancient Greek, Tocharian and Germanic languages.

Books

External links
 Personal webpage

Linguists from the United States
Yale University alumni
Bard College alumni
University of Pennsylvania faculty
Living people
Linguists of Indo-European languages
Linguists of Germanic languages
Alumni of the University of Oxford
Marshall Scholars
Linguists of Tocharian languages
Year of birth missing (living people)